Daniel James Worrall (born 10 July 1991) is an English-Australian cricketer. He played for South Australia in the Sheffield Shield competition and for the Adelaide Strikers in the Big Bash League. He was selected to play for Australia in 2016. He now lives in England, and will be classed as an international player in Australian competitions.

Career

Early career (2012–2015)
Worrall started his career playing for Melbourne Cricket Club in Victorian Premier Cricket, but he moved to Adelaide when he was offered a rookie contract with South Australia for the 2012–13 season. He made his first-class debut against Queensland in 2012, but he struggled to maintain a spot in the state side consistently for the next few years.

Breakout and international career (2015–present)
Worrall's breakout came in the 2015–16 Sheffield Shield season and BBL05. He recorded his first 5 wicket haul in first-class cricket when he took figures of 5/69 against Victoria in the first innings. He followed this up in the second innings with three more wickets as the Redbacks went on to win by 8 wickets. He made headlines at the end of BBL|05 when, after starting the season outside of the Melbourne Stars' squad, he was brought into the team because other members of the team's pace attack were called up to play for Australia. In the final match of the regular season he took figures of 3/15 against the Perth Scorchers to help guarantee the Stars a home semi-final, a performance that David Hussey described as "world-class". He followed this up in the semi-final, also against the Scorchers, by taking 3/25 in another win. His form continued to improve over the rest of the Sheffield Shield season, with career-best figures of 6/96 against Victoria in the Sheffield Shield final in the absence of fellow Redbacks fast bowler Chadd Sayers. He finished the season as the second-highest wicket taker of the Sheffield Shield, with 44 wickets at an average of 26.18, and as a result he was named by the South Australian Cricket Association as the most improved player for the 2015–16 season, having gone from a fringe member of the squad to one of the key members of the South Australian pace attack.

Worrall's improvement warranted selection in the Australia A squad for a 2016 quadrangular series in northern Queensland, during which he took figures of 4/26 against India A, his best figures in a List A match. After the series, despite having only played 12 List A matches in his career, he was added to the Australian national squad for their tour of South Africa. He made his ODI debut for Australia against Ireland on 27 September 2016.

Worrall played for South Australia in the 2017–18 JLT One-Day Cup. Worrall opened the bowling against Victoria in the elimination final, bowling a wide on the first ball but recovering to then bowl Aaron Finch for a golden duck in the same over. He finished the match with figures of 5/62 as Victoria fell short of South Australia's score and they advanced through to the final.

English County
In February 2018, Gloucestershire signed Worrall as their overseas player for the 2018 County Championship. In 2019, he re-signed with Gloucestershire, ahead of the 2019 County Championship in England. He returned to Gloucestershire for the 2021 season. He made his first appearance in the third game against Hampshire after missing the start of the season due to quarantine requirements.

In April 2022, he was bought by the Manchester Originals for the 2022 season of The Hundred.

Bowling style
Worrall bowls a fast-medium pace and makes use of swing in his bowling. He has a distinctive angled run-up, one of the strangest in domestic Australian cricket. He developed this run-up in his childhood, where there was an inconveniently placed tree in his backyard which made a direct approach to the crease impossible with the long run-up required for pace bowling.

References

1991 births
Living people
Australian cricketers
Australia One Day International cricketers
South Australia cricketers
Cricketers from Melbourne
Melbourne Stars cricketers
Gloucestershire cricketers
Adelaide Strikers cricketers
Surrey cricketers
Australian expatriate sportspeople in England